William Collins (15 November 1951 – 1 January 2014), better known by his stage name Billy McColl, was a Scottish actor.

Billy McColl died on 1 January 2014, aged 62, in London, England. He was survived by his daughter, Maud.

Filmography

References

External links

1951 births
2014 deaths
People from Hamilton, South Lanarkshire
People from Leven, Fife
Scottish male film actors
Scottish male television actors
Scottish male stage actors